

Season summary
Carlisle were relegated at the end of their first (and, as of 2022, only) season in English football's top flight. Carlisle started the season well beating Chelsea 2 - 0 at Stamford Bridge. After 3 games they were top of the league for the only time in their history.

Results & fixtures

Football League First Division

Football League Cup

FA Cup

Texaco Cup

Kit
Carlisle's kit was manufactured by Admiral.

First-team squad
Squad at end of season

References

 11v11

Carlisle United F.C. seasons
Carlisle United